Boloram Das (Balram) is an Indian actor who has appeared in Hindi, English and Assamese films. He is best known his roles in Badlapur Boys, Gabbar is Back and High Jack.

Early life and education 
Das was born in Guwahati, Assam. He completed his early education from Lal Singh Academy, Kharghuli, Guwahati, Assam and graduated in biochemistry from B. Borooah College, Guwahati, Assam. He had an interest in acting from childhood. He was associated with theatre group JYOTI from a young age and always wanted to pursue a career in acting. He acted in plays under his Guru Balin Chaudhury, Dilip Sharma, Neelu Chakrabarty and Bhupen Borkotoky. In 1992 he was awarded Best Child Actor in the 25th Allahabad Theatre Festival. He achieved the Gold Medal in Mimicry during Assam Youth Festival organized by Guwahati University.

After completing his graduation in 2004 he moved to Delhi with the hope of joining the National School of Drama. Though he failed to gain admission on the first attempt he continued to work in Delhi as a sales executive for a software company while working improve his language skills. He gained admission on this second attempt in 2006. After graduating from NSD, Das joined the National School of Drama Repertory Company and worked there for six months as a B grade artist.

In the year 2010 Boloram das joined Wizcraft International Company which started its new venture Kingdom of dreams in Gurgaon (Haryana). He worked as an actor in the musical play "Zangoora". During his time with Wizcraft he acted in around 800 shows before finally moving to Mumbai in 2013 to try his luck in Bollywood. He has acted in almost 30 plays. Das made his mark in theatre not only as an actor but as a director too having directed three plays: "Romeo and Juliet", "Mayongor Bez" and "Miss Julie".

Acting career 
Das started his acting career with the English Language film The Black Russian directed by Carlos Valle and Paul Sidhu in the year 2013. Next year he appeared in his first Bollywood movie Badlapur Boys. Since then he has acted in many Bollywood films like Gabbar Is Back, High Jack and Karwaan where he played the role of an iPad Man and a Cargo officer respectively. Some of his upcoming Bollywood Films are Om and Pepper Chicken. Recently he was widely appreciated for his negative role in Sony Liv Original Film Welcome Home.

Besides working in Hindi films Das continued to work in his vernacular Assamese and English language films. His first Assamese venture was Antareen released in 2017. In the same year he appeared in another Assamese movie named Beautiful Lives. On the other hand, his latest release in English language is Interconnect in 2018.

Apart from working on big screen  Das acted in many short films in both Hindi and Assamese language. Some of his notable short films are Do ke teen? (Hindi), Liakat (Assamese), Mirchi Light (Hindi) etc.

He has acted in Web Series like Boygiri (2017) and Typewriter (2019). He is a much known face in Indian television as he regularly appears in TVC. He has appeared in commercial like Parle Goldstar Coockies with Amitabh Bachhan, Hajmola with Ajay Devgn, Axis Bank, Dairy Milk, Hyundai, Swiggy food delivery app, Tata Sky, Tata Docomo, Eichar and Ram Bandhu Papad are some of his popular TVC.

Personal life 
Das was brought up in a family of four siblings in Guwahati, Assam. He is married to actor Tina Bhatia who he met during his time in NSD. After many years of friendship they finally got married in 2014.

Filmography

Awards and nominations 
Das started receiving awards from a very young age. He received two prestigious awards before venturing into films. He received Best Child Actor award in 25th Akhil Bharatiya Natya Samaroh, Allahabad in the year 1992. He also received Gold Medal in Mimicry in Assam Youth Festival organized by Gauhati University in the year 2003.

His first Assamese film Antareen got him his first award for a film actor. He received Best Supporting Actor at 7th Assam state film award from Government of Assam in the year 2015-16. He has received two state nominations also.

Best Actor Nomination in Prag Cine Award for the film Antareen in the year 2016

Best Actor Nomination in Prag Cine Award for the film "Beautiful Lives" in the year 2017.

89 th Dr. Bhabendra nath saikia memorial award, 2020 in the year 2021

References

External links 
 https://www.imdb.com/name/nm7992976/
 https://in.bookmyshow.com/person/boloram-das/1082504
 https://www.cinestaan.com/people/boloram-das-87999

Living people
Gauhati University alumni
Indian male film actors
Male actors in Hindi cinema
National School of Drama alumni
1985 births